Women's Network Croatia is a network of non-governmental organizations based in Zagreb, Croatia. The network is engaged in advocacy and protection of women's rights. Since its formal establishment in 1996 the network brings together numerous feminist organizations from Croatia. In October 2022 organization's coordinator Bojana Genov criticized government's plan for gender equality and prevention of gender based violence as completely inadequate.

References

External links
http://www.zenska-mreza.hr/clanice_mreze/ (members list)

Women's organizations based in Croatia
1996 establishments in Croatia